Mordellistena pseudolatipalposa is a species of beetle in the genus Mordellistena of the family Mordellidae. It was described by Franciscolo in 1957.

References

Beetles described in 1957
pseudolatipalposa